Sarah Jane Parkinson (6 June 1962 – 23 September 2003) was an English producer and writer of radio and television programmes, as well as an occasional actress. She was a regular performer on Week Ending in the final years of its run.

She was the daughter of actor Robin Parkinson and the second wife of comedian and writer Paul Merton.

Parkinson was diagnosed with breast cancer in February 2002. She and Merton had an unofficial marriage in the Maldives in October 2000 before marrying at Rye Town Hall, East Sussex, in June 2003.

After her death, Merton released the following statement through his agent: "After her initial devastating diagnosis of cancer in February 2002 Sarah successfully lived with the disease for the next 19 months. She refused chemotherapy because she knew it would finish her off. Instead, she boosted her immune system with a mixture of nutritional therapy, yoga, meditation, positive thinking and laughter. Consequently she led a full and active life right up to the last couple of weeks when her condition suddenly worsened."

References

External links
 
 BBC Guide To Comedy
 Edinburgh Fringe Festival review

1962 births
2003 deaths
Deaths from cancer in England
Deaths from breast cancer
English radio producers
English television producers
English television writers
British women television writers
Place of birth missing
British women television producers
20th-century English screenwriters
Women radio producers